Radafaxine (developmental code name GW-353,162), also known as (2S,3S)-hydroxybupropion or (S,S)-hydroxybupropion, is a norepinephrine–dopamine reuptake inhibitor (NDRI) which was under development by GlaxoSmithKline in the 2000s for a variety of different indications but was never marketed. These uses included treatment of restless legs syndrome, major depressive disorder, bipolar disorder, neuropathic pain, fibromyalgia, and obesity. Regulatory filing was planned for 2007, but development was discontinued in 2006 due to "poor test results".

Pharmacology

Pharmacodynamics
Radafaxine is described as a norepinephrine–dopamine reuptake inhibitor (NDRI). In contrast to bupropion, it appears to have a higher potency on inhibition of norepinephrine reuptake than on dopamine reuptake. Radafaxine has about 70% of the efficacy of bupropion in blocking dopamine reuptake, and 392% of efficacy in blocking norepinephrine reuptake, making it fairly selective for inhibiting the reuptake of norepinephrine over dopamine. This, according to GlaxoSmithKline, may account for the increased effect of radafaxine on pain and fatigue. At least one study suggests that radafaxine has a low abuse potential similar to bupropion.

Chemistry
Radafaxine is a potent metabolite of bupropion, the compound in GlaxoSmithKline's Wellbutrin. More specifically, "hydroxybupropion" is an analogue of bupropion, and radafaxine is an isolated isomer ((2S,3S)-) of hydroxybupropion. Therefore, radafaxine builds on at least some of the properties of bupropion in humans. Another analogue of bupropion, manifaxine (GW-320,659), was derived from radafxine and was also studied.

See also
 3-Chlorophenmetrazine
 Manifaxine

References

External links
 

Abandoned drugs
Alcohols
Antidepressants
Chloroarenes
Substituted amphetamines
Phenylethanolamines
Phenylmorpholines
Nicotinic antagonists
Norepinephrine–dopamine reuptake inhibitors